Naples Park is an unincorporated community and census-designated place (CDP) in Collier County, Florida, United States. The population was 5,967 at the 2010 census. It is part of the Naples-Marco Island, Florida Metropolitan Statistical Area.

Geography
It is part of the area known as North Naples, just north of Pelican Bay. It is bounded to the east by U.S. Route 41, to the north by 111th Avenue North, to the west by Vanderbilt Drive, and to the south by 91st Avenue North. Vanderbilt Lagoon is to the west, connecting to the Gulf of Mexico.

The Mercato, an outdoor shopping mall to the east of U.S. Route 41 is also considered part of Naples Park. It is the only portion of Naples Park to the east of U.S. Route 41.

Demographics

2020 census

As of the 2020 United States census, there were 5,092 people, 2,323 households, and 1,265 families residing in the CDP.

2000 census
As of the census of 2000, there were 6,741 people, 2,737 households, and 1,757 families residing in the CDP. The racial makeup of the CDP was 91.90% White, 1.32% African American, 0.13% Native American, 0.85% Asian, 0.06% Pacific Islander, 4.58% from other races, and 1.16% from two or more races. Hispanic or Latino of any race were 17.56% of the population.

There were 2,737 households, out of which 28.9% had children under the age of 18 living with them, 47.4% were married couples living together, 10.8% had a female householder with no husband present, and 35.8% were non-families. 24.9% of all households were made up of individuals, and 7.9% had someone living alone who was 65 years of age or older.  The average household size was 2.46 and the average family size was 2.88.

In the CDP, the population was spread out, with 22.4% under the age of 18, 7.3% from 18 to 24, 33.1% from 25 to 44, 22.2% from 45 to 64, and 15.0% who were 65 years of age or older.  The median age was 37 years. For every 100 females, there were 106.0 males.  For every 100 females age 18 and over, there were 107.5 males.

The median income for a household in the CDP was $41,820, and the median income for a family was $45,441. Males had a median income of $27,923 versus $28,038 for females. The per capita income for the CDP was $21,150.  About 4.6% of families and 7.8% of the population were below the poverty line, including 12.1% of those under age 18 and 4.6% of those age 65 or over.

References

Census-designated places in Collier County, Florida
Unincorporated communities in Collier County, Florida